La Cascada Airport,  is an airport  southeast of Molina, a city in the Maule Region of Chile.

The runway is in a valley alongside the Claro River. There are hills nearby in all quadrants.

See also

Transport in Chile
List of airports in Chile

References

External links
OpenStreetMap - La Cascada
OurAirports - La Cascada
FallingRain - La Cascada Airport

Airports in Chile
Airports in Maule Region